Johnny's Hamburgers is an eatery located in Scarborough, Toronto, at Victoria Park Avenue and Sheppard Avenue. It was established in 1967. It serves hamburgers, French fries, and other fast-food items, and is popular with locals. It is operated by Tasos Sklavos.

Comedian Mike Myers has endorsed the eatery several times during interviews as being a childhood favourite, having grown up in Scarborough. The spot was combined with the Canadian coffee and donut chain Tim Hortons to create Stan Mikita's, a fictional hangout appearing in Myers' famous Wayne's World movies.

See also

 List of hamburger restaurants

References

External links
Best Burgers, January 2007, Toronto Life review.
Official website

Restaurants in Toronto
Hamburger restaurants